Steven Anthony Smith (August 30, 1964 – November 20, 2021) was an American professional football player who was a fullback for nine seasons in the National Football League (NFL) with the Los Angeles Raiders and Seattle Seahawks. He was a team captain on the Penn State Nittany Lions's national championship team in 1986.

Smith was a third-round draft choice of the Raiders in the 1987 NFL Draft. Converted to fullback, Smith blocked for Raiders star running backs Bo Jackson and Marcus Allen. He then spent two seasons with Seattle until a back injury ended his career. Although primarily a blocker, he finished his career with 1627 rushing yards and 13 receiving touchdowns.

In 1995, Smith won the inaugural Madden Bowl, a tournament during Super Bowl weekend in which current and former NFL players compete at the Madden NFL video game.

After football
Smith married former Raiderette, Chie Aguilar-Hiroto from Cypress, CA in December  1989. The couple had two children, Dante (July 1990) and Jazmin (Sept 1991) and lived in Richardson, Texas. Smith had been afflicted with Lou Gehrig's disease from July 2002 until his death. He could not speak because of a ventilator and received his food through a feeding tube. He communicated via a state of the art computer system paid for by The Steve Gleason Foundation.

Smith was the focus of an August 17, 2010, episode of HBO's Real Sports with Bryant Gumbel exploring how toxic proteins that form after brain trauma may cause Lou Gehrig's disease. He died on November 20, 2021.

References

External links

"Commitment to Acceptance", Paul Turse, raiderdrive.com
Former Raider With ALS Wants To Help Others, The Dallas Morning News, July 19, 2003
Former Raider fullback Smith battles illness, Genaro C. Armas, The Associated Press, December 29, 2006
"Show of strength: Doctors told Steve Smith he was dying of ALS. He is now convinced that is not true", Frank Bodani, York Daily Record, July 11, 2004.
"Former PSU fullback Steve Smith still has strength to fight", Frank Bodani, York Daily Record, July 15, 2010.
“Former Oakland Raider, Steve Smith, and his fight against ALS”, ESPN Video.	
“Steve Smith, former Penn State and Raider Football Player, has ALS”, Real Sports with Bryant Gumbel, HBO, August 17, 2010.

1964 births
2021 deaths
American football running backs
DeMatha Catholic High School alumni
Los Angeles Raiders players
Penn State Nittany Lions football players
Players of American football from Washington, D.C.
Deaths from motor neuron disease
Players of American football from Maryland
Seattle Seahawks players